Basal or basilar is a term meaning base, bottom, or minimum.

Science
 Basal (anatomy), an anatomical term of location for features associated with the base of an organism or structure
 Basal (medicine), a minimal level that is necessary for health or life, such as a minimum insulin dose
 Basal (phylogenetics), a sister group relationship in a phylogenetic tree

Places
 Basal, Hungary, a village in Hungary
 Basal, Pakistan, a village in the Attock District

Other
 Basal plate (disambiguation)
 Basal sliding, the act of a glacier sliding over the bed before it due to meltwater increasing the water pressure underneath the glacier causing it to be lifted from its bed
 Basal conglomerate, see conglomerate (geology)

See also
 Basel (disambiguation)
 Basil (disambiguation)